Acrossocheilus monticola is a species of ray-finned fish in the genus Acrossocheilus.

References

Monticola
Fish described in 1888
Taxa named by Albert Günther